The List of athletes with Olympic medals in different sports is a list of athletes who have won medals in two different sports at the Olympic Games.

The list
This table is sorted by individual total gold medals. 

Table with arts competitions and 1906 Intercalated Games.

See also 
List of Olympians who have won medals in both the Summer and Winter Olympics

References

External links
 Olympics Statistics and History at Sports-Reference.com

Lists of Olympic medalists